Nuria Llagostera Vives was the defending champion, but chose to play at the 2006 Telecom Italia Masters, which was held during the same week.

Meghann Shaughnessy won the title, defeating Martina Suchá 6–2, 3–6, 6–3 in the final.

Seeds

Draw

Finals

Section 1

Section 2

Qualifying

Seeds

Qualifiers

Lucky losers

Qualifying draw

First qualifier

Second qualifier

Third qualifier

Fourth qualifier

References
 Results
  2006 Rome & Rabat WTA Singles Results     Martina Hingis & Meghann Shaughnessy, Champions

2006 WTA Tour
Morocco Open
2006 in Moroccan tennis